Disulfur difluoride is a halide of sulfur, with the chemical formula S2F2.

Structure 
Disulfur difluoride will undergo intramolecular rearrangement in the presence of alkali elements' fluorides, yielding the isomer S=SF2:

FS-SF ->[{} \atop \ce{KF}] \underset{Disulfur\ difluoride}{S=SF_2}

Synthesis 
Silver(II) fluoride can fluorinate sulfur in a strictly dry container, and the reaction produces FS-SF:

{S8} + \underset{Silver(II)\ fluoride}{8 AgF2} ->[{} \atop \ce{398K}] {4 S2F2} + 8 AgF

S=SF2 can be synthesized with the reaction of potassium fluorosulfite and disulfur dichloride:

2 KSO2F + S2Cl2 -> S=SF2 + 2KCl + 2 SO2

Reactions 
 Decomposing to sulfur tetrafluoride and sulfur when heated:
2S2F2 ->[{} \atop \ce{180^\circ C}]\ \underset{sulfur\ tetrafluoride}{SF4} + 3S 

 Treated with water:
2S2F2 + 2H2O -> SO2 + 3S + 4HF 

 Reacting with sulfuric acid:
{S2F2} + \underset{sulfuric\ acid}{3H2SO4} ->[{} \atop \ce{80^\circ C}] {5SO2} + {2HF} + 2H2O 

 Reacting with sodium hydroxide:
2S2F2 + 6NaOH -> Na2SO3 + 3S + 4NaF + 3H2O 

 Reacting with oxygen at high pressure, using nitrogen dioxide as the catalyst:
{2S2F2} + 5O2 ->[{} \atop \overset{}\ce{NO_2}] {SOF4} + 3SO3 

 Condensing with sulfur difluoride at low temperatures to yield 1,3-Difluoro-trisulfane-1,1-difluoride.
SSF2 + SF2 → FSSSF3

References 

Disulfides
Nonmetal halides
Sulfur fluorides